The H. B. Ailman House is a historic house located at 314 W. Broadway in Silver City, New Mexico. Prospector Henry B. Ailman had the house built using his profits from the Naiad Queen Silver Mine in Georgetown; his business partner H. M. Meredith built an identical house next door, which has since been demolished. The brick Victorian house features a -story square turret, which Ailman used to watch for Apache attacks on Silver City. Ailman and Meredith attempted to found a bank in Silver City, but it failed in 1887; Ailman's house changed owners several times in the following decades. The city took ownership of the house in 1926 and made it the new City Hall. The house became a firehouse after a new city hall was constructed. In 1967, the Silver City Museum opened in the house. The property today remains in operation as a historic house museum.

The house was added to the National Register of Historic Places on May 12, 1975.

See also

National Register of Historic Places listings in Grant County, New Mexico

References

Historic house museums in New Mexico
Houses on the National Register of Historic Places in New Mexico
Houses completed in 1881
Houses in Grant County, New Mexico
National Register of Historic Places in Grant County, New Mexico
1881 establishments in New Mexico Territory